Otmoor SSSI is a  biological Site of Special Scientific Interest north of Oxford in Oxfordshire. It is adjacent to RSPB Otmoor, and they are both part of Otmoor, an area of wetland and wet grassland which was enclosed in the early nineteenth century.

This site in the floodplain of the River Ray has herb-rich damp grassland, wet sedge, coarse grassland, woodland, pools and ditches. More than sixty species of bird breed on the site, such as curlew and lapwing, while wintering birds include teal, wigeon, snipe, golden plover and short-eared owl.

Much of the site is an MOD firing range and is closed to the public.

References

 
Sites of Special Scientific Interest in Oxfordshire